The Italian Formula Three Championship was the Formula Three racing competition in Italy.

History
Formula Three has traditionally been regarded as the first major stepping stone for F1 hopefuls - it is typically the first point in a driver's career at which most drivers in the series are aiming at professional careers in racing rather than being amateurs and enthusiasts. Success in F3 can lead directly to more senior formulae such as GP2, A1 Grand Prix, or even a Formula One test or race seat.

Most notably in the late 1980s and early 1990s, the Italian F3 championship produced drivers who graduated to Formula One to varying success. Other champions include successful World Sportscar driver Max Angelelli (1992 series champion) and Riccardo Patrese.

In December 2012, CSAI (the Italian motorsports commission) announced it would cancel the Formula 3 championship to focus on Formula Abarth.

Scoring system
Since the 2012 season, points are awarded for race finishing drivers as follows:

Champions

References

External links
Italian Formula 3 Championship at forix.com
Official Web Site at acisportitalia.it
Italian Formula 3 Championship at forix.com

 
1964 establishments in Italy
2012 disestablishments in Italy
Recurring sporting events established in 1964
Recurring events disestablished in 2012
Defunct auto racing series
Formula Three series
Defunct sports competitions in Italy